A hangnail is a tiny, torn piece of skin next to a fingernail or toenail, related to ingrown nails. The hangnail's other scientific names are: eponychium or paronychium. Hangnails are typically caused by having dry skin, or by trauma to the fingers, such as paper cuts or nail biting.

Presentation

Complications

Hangnails can become infected and cause paronychia, a type of skin infection that occurs around the nails. Treatments for paronychia vary with severity, but may include soaking in hot salty water, the use of oral antibiotic medication, or clinical lancing. Paronychia itself rarely results in further complications but can lead to abscess, permanent changes to the shape of the nail, or the spread of infection. Hangnails may also hurt if pulled, as they may remain firmly attached to living skin.

Prevention 
Daily use of hand lotion (or hand cream) or cuticle oil may help prevent the formation of hangnails.

Treatment
For home treatment, the American Academy of Dermatology recommends washing the hands, clipping the loose piece of skin with a clean nail clipper or nail scissors, and applying over-the-counter antibiotic ointment if the area appears inflamed. Persistent hangnails should be evaluated by a physician.

References

Nails (anatomy)
Conditions of the skin appendages

de:Nagel (Anatomie)#Niednagel